The 1984 Stockholm Open was a men's tennis tournament played on indoor hard courts and part of the 1984 Volvo Grand Prix and took place at the Kungliga tennishallen in Stockholm, Sweden. It was the 16th edition of the tournament and was held from 29 October through 5 November 1984. First-seeded John McEnroe won the singles title, his third at the event after 1978 and 1979, and earned $45,000 first-prize money.

Finals

Singles

 John McEnroe defeated  Mats Wilander, 6–2, 3–6, 6–2
 It was McEnroe's 12th singles title of the year and the 58th of his career.

Doubles

 Henri Leconte /  Tomáš Šmíd defeated  Vijay Amritraj /  Ilie Năstase, 3–6, 7–6, 6–4

References

External links
 
 ATP tournament profile
 ITF tournament edition details

Stockholm Open
Stockholm Open
Stockholm Open
Stockholm Open
Stockholm Open
1980s in Stockholm